O Ébrio (English: The Drunkard) is a 1946 Brazilian film directed by Gilda de Abreu. The screenplay is based on a song by Vicente Celestino. The film, in addition to being the first Brazilian sound film directed by a woman, was a commercial and critical success, with approximately 4 million viewings between 1946 and 1950. It is still regarded as "one of the great successes of Brazilian Cinema", according to film historian João Luiz Vieira.

Cast 
Vicente Celestino... Gilberto Silva
Alice Archambeau... Marieta
Rodolfo Arena... Primo José
Victor Drummond... father Simão
Manoel Vieira... Pedro's father
Walter D'Ávila... Primo Rego
Júlia Dias... Lola
Arlete Lester... Maricota
José Mafra... Primo Leão
Isabel de Barros... Princesinha (as Izabelinha Barros)
Antonia Marzullo... Lindoca
Marilu Dantas...empregada de Gilberto
Manoel Rocha... barman
Jacy de Oliveira... Maria das Neves
Amadeu Celestino - Vicente Celestino's brother

References

External links

1940s musical drama films
1946 films
Brazilian musical drama films
1940s Portuguese-language films
Cinédia films
Brazilian black-and-white films
1946 drama films